Indirect presidential elections were held in Chile on 25 July 1856. Incumbent President Manuel Montt was re-elected by a system of electors

Results

References

Presidential elections in Chile
Chile
1856 in Chile
Election and referendum articles with incomplete results